NAPFA is an acronym with several meanings:

 National Association of Personal Financial Advisors, an American organization created to aid the field of fee-only financial planning
 National Physical Fitness Award, part of Singapore's "Sports For Life" programme